Webster Park is an unincorporated community in Bureau County, Illinois, United States, located east of Spring Valley.
Webster Park offers a variety of attractions including the park located in Webster Park, which is now called Noles Park, named after the family that donated the land. The park is most known for "The Square," a half basketball court. 
The Square was built in August 2010 by volunteers through donations from the Spring Valley Park Board.

References

Unincorporated communities in Bureau County, Illinois
Unincorporated communities in Illinois